Mordellistena dolobrata is a beetle in the genus Mordellistena of the family Mordellidae. It was described in 1873 by Theodor Franz Wilhelm Kirsch.

References

dolobrata
Beetles described in 1873